Nyctixalus pictus, also known as cinnamon frog, cinnamon treefrog, cinnamon bush frog, painted Indonesian treefrog, and white-spotted  treefrog, etc., is a species of frog in the family Rhacophoridae. It is found in the Malay Peninsula (including southernmost Thailand), the Philippines, and parts of the Greater Sunda Islands (northern Borneo and northern Sumatra).

Distribution
This species is found in the Malay Peninsula (from extreme southern Thailand through Peninsular Malaysia to Singapore), Sumatra (Indonesia), Borneo (Brunei, Malaysia, and Indonesia), and the Philippines.

Description
The snout is obtusely pointed. The tympanum is distinct. The limbs are long and the finger and toe tips are dilated into large discs. The fingers have no webbing whereas the toes are partly webbed. Coloration is brown or reddish brown with white to yellow spots on the body.

Habitat and conservation
The tadpoles develop in arboreal water-filled cavities (including phytotelms) and in rotting logs.

Nyctixalus pictus is widespread but uncommon. Populations are threatened by habitat loss due to clearing of forests for agriculture and logging. Its range includes several protected areas. In Singapore, it is only found in the Bukit Timah and Central Catchment Nature Reserves.

References

pictus
Amphibians of Brunei
Amphibians of Indonesia
Amphibians of Malaysia
Amphibians of the Philippines
Amphibians of Singapore
Amphibians of Thailand
Amphibians of Borneo
Fauna of Sumatra
Amphibians described in 1871
Taxa named by Wilhelm Peters
Taxonomy articles created by Polbot